Executive producer (EP) is one of the top positions in the making of a commercial entertainment product. Depending on the medium, the executive producer may be concerned with management accounting or associated with legal issues (like copyrights or royalties). In films, the executive producer generally contributes to the film's budget and their involvement depends on the project, with some simply securing funds and others being involved in the filmmaking process.

Motion pictures 

In films, executive producers may finance the film, participate in the creative effort, or work on set. Their responsibilities vary from funding or attracting investors into the movie project to legal, scripting, marketing, advisory and supervising capacities.

Executive producers vary in involvement, responsibility and power. Some executive producers have hands-on control over every aspect of production, some supervise the producers of a project, while others are involved in name only.

The crediting of executive producers in the film industry has risen over time. In the mid-to-late 1990s, there were an average of just under two executive producers per film. In 2000, the number jumped to 2.5 (more than the number of standard "film producers"). In 2013, there were an average of 4.4 executive producers per film. One reason for the increase in executive producers per film is the desire to spread risk, whether due to increasing cost of film making for larger budget films, often met by multiple studios banding together, or alternatively the need to attract multiple smaller investors for lower budget independent films.

Television 

In television, an executive producer usually supervises the creative content, plans and schedules the filming with the producer and team and may be involved in the financial budgeting of a production. Some writers, like Aaron Sorkin, Stephen J. Cannell, Tina Fey, and Ryan Murphy, have worked as both the creator and the producer of the same show. In the case of multiple executive producers on a television show, the one outranking the others on a day-to-day basis is called the showrunner, or the leading executive producer.

Music

In recorded music, record labels distinguish between an executive producer and a record producer. The executive producer is responsible for business decisions and more recently, organizing the recordings along with the music producer, whereas the record producer makes the music. Sometimes the executive producer organizes the recording and selects recording-related crew, such as sound engineers and session musicians.

Video games 

In the video game industry, the title "executive producer" is not well-defined. It may refer to an external producer working for the publisher, who works with the developers. 

For example, in 2012, Jay-Z was announced as executive producer for NBA 2K13. His role consisted of appearing in an introduction, picking songs for the game's soundtrack and contributing to the designs of its in-game menus "and other visual elements".

Radio 

An executive radio producer helps create, develop, and implement strategies to improve product and ratings.

See also 
 Creative executive
 Development executive
 Line producer
 Senior producer and supervising producer
 Showrunner
 Studio executive
 Unit production manager
 Music supervisor

References

External links 
 "What is the point of executive producers?" BBC News. 19 October 2007.

Filmmaking occupations
Mass media occupations
Entertainment occupations
Broadcasting occupations

Management occupations